Čeplje is a dispersed settlement in the hills north of Lukovica pri Domžalah in the eastern part of the Upper Carniola region of Slovenia.

References

External links

Čeplje on Geopedia

Populated places in the Municipality of Lukovica